Itamar Zorman (born 1985, Tel Aviv) is an Israeli violinist.

Early life
Zorman is the son of Israeli pianist Astrith Baltsan and composer Moshe Zorman.  At age six, he began violin studies with Saly Bockel at the Israeli Conservatory of Music.  His other teachers included David Chen and Nava Milo, and he graduated from the conservatory in 2003.  He continued studies at the Jerusalem Academy of Music and Dance, with such teachers as Hagai Shaham.  He further studied at the Juilliard School, with such teachers as Robert Mann and Sylvia Rosenberg, and obtained his MM degree from Juilliard in 2009.  He obtained a diploma in arts from the Manhattan School of Music a year later, and an artists' diploma from Juilliard in 2012.  He continued his studies with Christian Tetzlaff at the Kronberg Academy, Germany. 

Zorman is a founding member of the Israeli Chamber Project and has been a member of the Lysander Piano Trio.  His first solo CD recording, entitled Portrait, was released by Profil in Europe in August 2014 and in the United States in February 2015.  His 2nd CD, Evocation, features violin works by Paul Ben-Haim, in collaboration with pianist Amy Yang, conductor Philippe Bach, and the BBC National Orchestra of Wales.

Zorman performs on a 1734 Giuseppe Guarneri violin, from the collection of Yehuda Zisapel.

Awards
In 2010, Zorman won first prize in the Freiburg International Violin Competition, and also the Arriaga Competition and grand prize at the Coleman Chamber Music Competition  In 2011, Zorman won first prize at the International Tchaikovsky Competition. In 2012 he became a winner of the Concert Artists Guild Competition.  In 2013, he was awarded an Avery Fisher Career Grant, as well as scholarships from the America Israel Cultural Foundation.  He is the recipient of the 2014 Borletti-Buitoni Award.

References

External links
 Official webpage of Itamar Zorman
 Eastman School of Music, faculty page on Itamar Zorman
 Frank Salomon Associates agency page on Itamar Zorman
 Heifetz Institute page on Itamar Zorman
 Kronberg Academy English-language page on Itamar Zorman

1985 births
Living people
Musicians from Tel Aviv
Israeli violinists
Male violinists
21st-century violinists
21st-century male musicians